Pearson's long-clawed shrew (Solisorex pearsoni) is a species of mammal in the family Soricidae. It is the only species within the genus Solisorex. It is endemic to Sri Lanka. Its natural habitats are subtropical or tropical dry forests and lowland grasslands. It is threatened by habitat loss. It is named after Joseph Pearson FRSE, Director of the Columbo Museum 1910-1933 who found it on 1 January 1924.

Description
It is dark grayish-brown above, with light tips to the hairs, and paler on the underside. The forefeet are brown in color and the tail is dark brown above and lighter below.

References

Sources
 Insectivore Specialist Group 1996. Solisorex pearsoni. 2006 IUCN Red List of Threatened Species. Downloaded on 30 July 2007.

White-toothed shrews
Endemic fauna of Sri Lanka
Mammals described in 1924
Taxa named by Oldfield Thomas
Taxonomy articles created by Polbot
Solisorex